Marcos Brian Benavídez (born 23 March 1993) is an Argentine professional footballer who last played as a forward for Deportes Santa Cruz.

References
 
 

1993 births
Living people
Argentine footballers
Association football forwards
Club Atlético Atlas footballers
Club Luján footballers
Deportes Concepción (Chile) footballers
Deportes Santa Cruz footballers
Independiente de Cauquenes footballers
Primera B de Chile players
Argentine expatriate footballers
Argentine expatriate sportspeople in Chile
Expatriate footballers in Chile
People from San Luis, Argentina